Shiuhpyng Shieh from the National Chiao Tung University, Hsinchu, Taiwan was named Fellow of the Institute of Electrical and Electronics Engineers (IEEE) in 2014 "for advances in pattern-oriented intrusion detection and fault-tolerant protection". He is currently the Editor-in-Chief of IEEE Transactions on Reliability.

References

Fellow Members of the IEEE
Living people
Year of birth missing (living people)
Place of birth missing (living people)